Gay Jane P. Perez is a Filipino physicist and environmental scientist whose research involves satellite observation of environmental conditions, and the applications of that data in agricultural planning. She is a professor in the Institute of Environmental Science and Meteorology at the University of the Philippines Diliman, and Deputy Director General of the Philippine Space Agency.

Education and career
Perez is originally from Naga, Camarines Sur, where she attended a Catholic girls' school. She studied physics at the University of the Philippines Diliman, earning a bachelor's degree in 2003, a master's degree in 2005, and a Ph.D. in 2009. She went to the US in 2010–2011 for postdoctoral research at the Hydrospheric and Biospheric Sciences Laboratory of the NASA Goddard Space Flight Center, working there on remote sensing.

Returning to the Philippines, she became the leader of the team that produced Diwata-1, the first microsatellite constructed in the Philippines. Her team also produced two later satellites, Maya-1 and Diwata-2, launched respectively in 2016, 2018, and 2019.

In 2022, she was elected to a four-year term as president of the Technical Commission on Education and Outreach of the International Society for Photogrammetry and Remote Sensing, the first Filipino to lead the commission.

Recognition
Perez won the 2018 ASEAN-US Science Prize for Women, becoming the first Filipino to do so. She was an awardee of The Outstanding Women in the Nation's Service for 2019. The National Academy of Science and Technology named her as their 2021 NAST Outstanding Young Scientist for Physical Sciences.

References

External links

Year of birth missing (living people)
People from Naga, Camarines Sur
Living people
Filipino physicists
Filipino agronomists
Filipino climatologists
Filipino women scientists
University of the Philippines Diliman alumni
Academic staff of the University of the Philippines Diliman